The Antagonist Art Movement was a cultural movement formed in New York City in 2000. The group grew out of desperation and in reaction to the New York art market. The movement primarily involves visual arts, literature, film, art manifestos and graphic design. The Antagonist Art Movement articulates its anti-commercial politics through a rejection of the prevailing standards in the art market and focuses its efforts on creating non-commercial cultural works and venues. Its purpose is to ridicule the meaninglessness, superficiality and artificiality of the commercial art world. The Antagonists foster emerging talent by providing opportunities for the exhibition of works, networking with other artists, mentoring and resources. The Antagonist Movement has worked with more than 3,500 artists from around the world over the past 14 years.

Overview 
Antagonist activities have included public gatherings, demonstrations, the publication of art/literary journals, the production of documentary films, a clothing line, weekly art shows, writer's nights and a public access television show. For many of its members, the Movement is their protest against the established commercial art market in which there is little chance for unknown artists to succeed, regardless of how talented they may be.   
Based in Manhattan's Lower East Side, the Antagonist Movement also has participants in other US cities, Europe and South America.
Influenced by punk rock, pop art and by the Dada movement, the Antagonist Movement seeks to be inclusive of all forms of art and individual artist’s styles and expressions as long as the work provokes.

History 
Ethan Minsker, Sergio Vega, and Anders Olson first conceived of the Antagonist Movement  while working in bars in the Lower East Side. They wanted to create an event that would also incorporate their individual passions: art, film, music and writing. The first art show was held in the basement of Niagara Bar in January 2000. It featured art by Minsker, Olson and Dima Drjuchin. The owners of the bar asked the group to do this pop-up art event every Thursday for one year. They would end up doing these one-night art shows for over 11 years, showcasing the works of more than 3,000 up-and-coming artists. The Antagonists added live performances to the events, such as Schocholautte, Lisa Jaeggi, Carla Rhodes, Champions of Sound, Dead on a Friday and Vic Ruggiero. Minsker used film to document the larger events of the group and events held in other US cities and abroad.

In 2002, the Antagonists began a writer's night on Sunday nights at Black & White Bar, just a few blocks away. The actor and comedian Jonah Hill was discovered performing at one of these events. Past hosts of the writer's night have included Bryan Middleton, Richard Allen and Brother Mike Cohen. Minsker took the helm of the Antagonist Movement in 2003 when Vega and Olson began spending more time on other projects. Around this time, the group appointed its first art directors who would guide the artistic direction of the movement. Gabriel Coutu-Dumont and Anders Olson served in this capacity from 2000-2005. Ted Riederer was the artistic director from 2005 to the present. Riederer's other major projects include Never Records.

Events

Weekly events

Ignite (2000–2011) 
One night art shows on Thursdays. Three to six artists showed new works every Thursday at Niagara Bar on East 7th Street in New York City. The art was installed between 8 pm and 9 pm and stayed up until 2 am. The Antagonists took a small commission and the artists kept the rest. Money earned from the art sales, in turn, was used to fund Movement projects. However, most artists did not sell anything. The focus of the event was to build a community who could support and help each other.  For many artists, it was their first public showing. Along with the art slams, there often was live music and/or performance art. The events were held in the basement of the bar until 2008 when the bar owners created a gallery space on the ground floor, at the back of the bar. The Thursday night art shows ended in the fall of 2011 after the Antagonists and the owners could not reach an agreement upon a different night to show.

Alphabet City Soup (2009–2011) 
Live music on Monday nights. From punk rock to chiptunes, on any given Monday from 8 pm to 10 pm, free live shows were performed in the back of Niagara bar under the banner of the Antagonists. For the first year, the Monday night shows were hosted by the band Schocholautte, who also composed music for two Antagonist films, This Is Berlin, Not New York and The Dolls of Lisbon. In 2010, music bookings were taken over by Marissa Bea. Bea would also act as managing editor on much of the literature published by the Antagonist Movement.

Fahrenheit (2002-present) 
Open mic Sundays. Writer's night is held at Black & White bar at 86 East 10th Street New York City. Originally, it was held every Sunday night but it has since been reduced to the first Sunday of every month. This event was created by the first host, Bryan Middleton. The rules are writers have five minutes, and no poetry. But the rules are constantly broken. In later years, a timer was added to keep the writers within their allotted time. To control noisy bar patrons during readings, the bartender keeps a two-sided sign. One side reads: "Please respect our writers and keep your voices down." If that fails to work, the other side reads: "Now shut the F--- Up!" The writers range from a retired wrestler to published authors, and everyone in between.

Linda Kleinbub and Jennifer Juneau began hosting Fahrenheit on 7 October 2018. The show continues to be on the first Sunday of the month with sign up at 6:30 and showtime from 7 to 10 pm.

One-off events 
Over the years, the Antagonists have sponsored dozens of themed shows, often held in the front room of Niagara or on the streets of the Lower East Side. Theme shows have included "The Box Show", "The Photo Booth Show", "New York Underwater Show" and "Caffeinate and Decimate." Under the guidelines the pieces had to be new and produced based on the theme. Themes are determined by a combination of curators, artists, and members of the Antagonist Movement. These shows ranged from 10 to 100 artists. The goal of these events was to bring together a diverse community of artists for networking and production opportunities.

Sketchbook Party (2009) 
This event was a gathering of 30 artists. The warm-up consisted of passing around the artists’ sketchbooks before competing in a battle for the best artist, judged by the audience. In the first round of competition, two artists faced off, drawing each other within three minutes. The winner moved on to round two, where the artists drew the artist facing him/her in addition someone standing next to the artist. In round three, artists drew the other artist, a person standing next to him/her and a prop. Because most artists work alone, this event brought a social and fun aspect to the artists’ creativity.

Rat House Project (2010) 
In the East Village, middle school kids were making bird houses as part of their school projects. The neighbors began complaining when they discovered that rats were getting into the bird houses and eating the bird food. Eleven artists made elaborate homes for rats, each less than two square feet. The rat houses were installed in a vacant lot on 14th Street in New York City and remained up for three weeks until many were stolen, and the owner of the lot had the rat houses removed.

Obscure Dictators 
This was a two-month theme show of portraits of normal people depicted as dictators. Based on the theory that dictators are average people with access to power, any of us could be a dictator. Eleven artists took part, including Kevin Cyr, Catharine Lyons, Thomas Sarvello, Ted Riederer and Pete Petrine. This show was exhibited in the front room of Niagara bar and is featured in the Antagonist movie Mark of the Ninja.

Gallery Shows 
From time to time, the Antagonist Movement holds group art shows in small commercial galleries to exhibit works of selected artists.

"Behold, the Antagonist," Dead Cat Gallery, Providence Rhode Island (2008) 
More than 20 New York based artists traveled to Providence to participate in a special exhibition. Curated by Ted Riederer, the artists’ works were diverse and dynamic, including videos, sculptures, interactive, photography and paintings. The artists used the visit to Rhode Island to meet New England artists for an exchange of ideas, experiences and sociability.

Mindy Wyatt Gallery, New York, New York (2009) 
Held in conjunction with the Royal Flush Festival, the Mindy Wyatt Gallery presented a curated group show of select artists of the Antagonist Art Movement. Exhibiting artists included Pat Conlon, Sylvia Ortiz, Jeffrey Beebe, Jeramy Fletcher, Ted Riederer, Anders Olson, Alex Passapera and Daniel York Krupin.

"Pop Up Lisboa," Lisbon, Portugal (2010)
The Antagonist Art Movement combined the efforts of artists from all over the world to put together a doll show within the Pop Up Lisboa show. Blank dolls were sent to more than 60 artists worldwide, who painted, sewed, demolished, or otherwise marked up their doll, and returned it to New York City. The dolls were then brought to Lisbon and displayed. This was prominently featured in the film The Dolls of Lisbon.

"Weapon," Fardom Gallery, Long Island City, NY (2012) 
This show featured the art of Gavin Kenyon, Ethan H. Minsker, Ted Riederer, Shannon Daugherty and Jay Ivcevich. The fascination with weaponry has been a longstanding human trait. From man’s beginning, and one of the reasons for its distinction, weapons have played a crucial role as the provider and protector, satiating the thirst for power. Weaponry is the essential tool for settling disputes, defining heroes, villains, victims, and victors, acting as both the liberator and the repressor. Often, the harshest verdict is the ultimate result of our intrigue and obsession with weaponry; a fetish fueled by the necessity to nurture and harness man’s volatile ego.

International activities 
Starting in 2007, the Antagonist began actively developing cultural exchanges with artists in other countries. Antagonist artists traveled to Germany in 2007, to Portugal in 2010, and to Ecuador in 2013. In addition, the Antagonist Movement is actively seeking contacts with artists in Asia, Africa and the Middle East.

Films 
These low-budget films were made with funding from the Thursday night art shows and from sales of art and Antagonist merchandise. In recent years, the Antagonists have used Kickstarter.com to fund production of a series of films, many of which document Antagonist art events and profile upcoming artists. Each film acts as a vehicle for promoting local talent, highlighting artists, actors, filmmakers, writers and musicians.

The Soft Hustle (2000) 
The 70-minute narrative film is the story of a Lower East Side lowlife who makes a bet for $1,000, which he promptly loses. The film took four years to complete. Ethan H. Minsker and his crew filmed one scene per week until its completion. Real guns were used as it was cheaper than renting props or getting required city permits. The drugs in the Atlantic City scenes were also authentic. The story is based on real events that took place in the bar where Minsker had begun to bartend.  It is a narrative film made from donated or stolen resources.

Mark of the Ninja (2004) 
This film covers the art events of the Antagonist Movement in 2004.  It showcases one night art shows, writers nights and a street art project.  The film won the award as Best Documentary in the Evil City Film Fest. It has been screened at the New Directors Series at the Anthology Film Archives in New York.  The film was re-released on DVD with the film Anything Boys Can Do by the Antagonist Movement and is sub-distributed by Emphasis Entertainment Group.

This Is Berlin, Not New York (2008) 
This 72-minute feature art documentary is about Antagonist artists making art and friends overseas. The film is sold at places like St. Mark's Bookshop and the Brooklyn Museum of Arts gift shop. The DVD is distributed by the Antagonist Movement and sub-distributed by Emphasis Entertainment Group.

The Dolls of Lisbon (2011) 
This 72-minute art documentary features underground artists from the United States, Ecuador, Portugal, and fellow Antagonist artists in Europe. In this film, interviews of artists in their own studio space are featured throughout the film as well as covering three weeks of events in Lisbon. It took three years to complete.

Self Medicated (2014) 
"Whether you are a successful artist, an unproven entity, or struggling to create while working a 9-5, there is a common thread amongst most creative types: a depression that is kept at bay by producing new works. Art can serve an artist much in the same way any drug might." Self Medicated   is a film about art, artists, and their struggles to stay happy. This film documents the entire history of the Antagonist Movement and the artists involved, employing animation, stop-motion film techniques, interviews, and a killer soundtrack that spans the globe. From the street to the gallery and back again, Self Medicated reveals a new wave in art from the last American art movement.

Broadcast

Current TV (2007–2008) 
Originally scheduled to be a ten episode series about the Antagonist Movement, only four episodes were broadcast after the channel changed its format to half-hour shows. NYC Underwater, Angst, Lies & Audio Tape, Make Your Own Damn Shirt and Album Armor  were featured in the shows. The producer of this series, Anthony Ferraro, is a member of the Antagonist. He worked on a number of Antagonist films before moving to California and beginning work at Current TV. Some of the short Antagonist videos where featured on Current’s foreign channels as well as in-flight programming for Virgin Atlantic.

Public Access TV (2003-present) 
Titled "Antagovision", this show is broadcast on Manhattan Neighborhood Network Channel 67 every Tuesday night at 11 pm. There are more than 60 28-minute episodes, interviews, live music and short films of the events sponsored by the Antagonist Movement.

Publishing 
The Antagonist Movement began its publishing department after taking over Psycho Moto fanzine, which created yet another outlet for artists and writers. Attempting to diverge from the publishing establishment, the Antagonists placed an emphasis on multiple layers of editing and art direction. Each published work is designed to be a stand-alone piece of art. Writers and artists are paired up for each project. Promotion sometimes consists of plastering the New York City with posters and stickers of the books. Each book release incorporates an art show based on the theme of the book or publication.

Psycho Moto Zine (2000–2006, 2013-Present) 
The new incarnation of the fanzine took on a role of supporting young artists. The idea was born from a realization that there are few opportunities for struggling artists and writers to showcase their work. The fanzine serves as a platform for exposure. Ethan H. Minsker's experience with producing this fanzine in its previous form (East Coast Exchange) inspired the formation of the Antagonist Movement.

Somewhere Between a Punch and a Handshake (2004) 
Published by the Antagonist Movement, this book was written by Brother Mike Cohen with artwork by Andy Mags, Un Lee and Vickers Gringo. The book features disturbing short stories of the life and times of Brother Mike who has an obsession with classic rock and a love for Buffalo New York and his cat. Brother Mike hosts the writer's night and was discovered while working as a DJ at Niagara bar. Brother Mike's spoken word performance can be seen in the movie, Mark of the Ninja.

Rich Boy Cries for Momma (2010) 
A fictional memoir by Ethan H. Minsker. A coming-of-age novel that is set during the period of D.C.’s now legendary hardcore music scene. It follows Minsker's boot prints: the privileged son turned punk rocker. The story is drawn from Minsker's experiences growing up in Washington, D.C. during the '70s and '80s as the son of prominent lawyers. The book features original illustrations by up-and-coming artists: the cover art is the work of Kevin Cyr and the inside illustrations are by Ted Riederer. In August 2011, Rich Boy Cries for Momma was featured in the art show "I Bleed Black" at the Marianne Boesky Gallery.

Barstool Prophets (2011) 
A fictional memoir by Ethan H. Minsker. The second in a trilogy of novels, is set in the bars of New York's Lower East Side. Giving fictional accounts of true events, the novel follows the lives of a wild spectrum of characters, narrated by a young writer working in a bar. The story chronicles an iconic neighborhood over a period of 20 years, from its seedy early '90s to its recent gentrification into a Manhattan hot spot. The cover art is by Dan Krupin and the inside illustrations are by Dan Krupin and Un Lee. This book was produced in the same vein as Minsker's first book, Rich Boy Cries for Momma; it is both a work of art and of literature.

Iconography

Clothing line 
Beginning with a line of T-shirts, the Antagonists hand-printed a limited number of original designs by a variety of artists all of whom had show previously with the Antagonists. The clothing line has been expanded to hats, patches, jackets, pins, wristbands and sweatshirts. Some of the clothing items were made in collaboration with designer Michael Houghton. The money raised from sales of clothes and movie DVDs fund art projects, films, fanzines and travel expenses.

Logos 
The different logos of the Antagonist Movement were designed by Gabriel Coutu-Dumont, Un Lee, Doug McQueen and James Jajac. Over the years, the Antagonist Movement has introduced a variety of logos meant to show the passage of time and the diversity of the group as a whole. Stickers emblazoned with each design cover lower Manhattan.  Antagonists from around the world often send pictures of Antagonist stickers in other cities.

Members 
Partial list: 

Ryan Adams (writer) 
Richard Allen (writer) 
Zeke Terwilliger (writer and champion of social justice) 
Raul Ayala (artist) 
Marissa Bea (artist/writer) 
Jeffrey Beebe (artist) 
Danny Bevins (writer and stand up comic) 
Steven Bindernargel (artist) 
Jason Boog (writer) 
Colin Burns (painter) 
Shane Caffrey (artist) 
Brother Mike Cohen (writer) 
Pat Conlon (artist) 
Mike Diaz (writer) 
Fidel Évora (painter) 
Shepard Fairey (artist) 
Jeramy Fletcher (artist) 
Ido Fluk (writer/video artist) 
Erik Foss (artist) 
Jeff Glovsky (writer)
Richard Hambleton 
Góthic Hangman (artist) 
Allison Hester (artist) 
Jonah Hill (writer/actor) 
Jay Ivcevich (artist) 
Lenny Kaye (writer's night) 
Gavin Kenyon (sculptor) 
Dan Krupin (painter) 
Wes Lang (art night) 
Un Lee (artist and animator) 
Brian Leo (painter) 
Legs McNeil (author)  
Douglas McQueen (artist) 
Brian Montuori (artist) 
Fabrizio Moretti 
Michael O'Brien (writer's night) 
Sylvia Ortiz (painter) 
Alex Passapera (artist) 
Ted Riederer (of Never Records) 
James Rubio (painter)
Philipp Schrader (artist) 
Crispy T (street artist) 
Jakob Theileis (artist) 
Anton Theileis (artist) 
Johnny Valiant (wrestler) 
Arturo Vega (artistic director, the Ramones)  
Eric Wallin (artist) 
Jack Walls (writer and artist)

Curators 
Partial list:

Carlos Alcobia (The Dolls of Lisbon) 
Berto Ray Barreto 
Shannon Daugherty 
Michelle Halabura 
Un Lee 
Greyegg McKenna 
Fridey Mickel (This Is Berlin, Not New York) 
Ethan Minsker (head curator) 
Anders Olson

References

Fanpages 
 Anything Boys Can Do 
 This is Berlin, Not New York 
 The Dolls of Lisbon 
 The Soft Hustle 
 Barstool Prophets 
 Rich Boy Cries for Momma

External links 
 https://twitter.com/antagonistart
 https://www.youtube.com/user/AntagonistMovement
 https://web.archive.org/web/20190201202208/http://www.antagovision.com/
 http://theantagonistblog.blogspot.com/
 http://therealantagonistmovement.tumblr.com/
 http://www.citizensforthearts.com/

American art movements
Art & Language